= Dugans Run =

Stream in Ohio, U.S.

Coordinates: 39°31′32″N 84°12′45″W

Dugans Run is a stream in the U.S. state of Ohio.

Dugans Run was named in honor of a local family.
